Tate Township is one of the fourteen townships of Clermont County, Ohio, United States. The 2010 census reported 9,357 people living in the township, 6,646 of whom were in the unincorporated portions of the township.

Geography
Located in the southeastern part of the county, it borders the following townships:
Williamsburg Township - north
Pike Township, Brown County - northeast corner
Clark Township, Brown County - east
Lewis Township, Brown County - southeast
Franklin Township - south
Washington Township - southwest
Monroe Township - west
Batavia Township - northwest

The village of Bethel is located in central Tate Township. Public education is provided by the Bethel-Tate School District.

Name and history
It is the only Tate Township statewide.

Government
The township is governed by a three-member board of trustees, who are elected in November of odd-numbered years to a four-year term beginning on the following January 1. Two are elected in the year after the presidential election and one is elected in the year before it. There is also an elected township fiscal officer, who serves a four-year term beginning on April 1 of the year after the election, which is held in November of the year before the presidential election. Vacancies in the fiscal officership or on the board of trustees are filled by the remaining trustees.

References

External links
Township website
County website

Townships in Clermont County, Ohio